Centrepoint is a rapid transit station on the Red Line of the Dubai Metro in Dubai, UAE.

The eastern terminus of the line, it is one of 3 metro stations with a park and ride lot, the others being Etisalat and Jabal Ali.

The station was previously known as Rashidiya, on 4 August 2021 it was renamed as Centrepoint.

Location
Centrepoint station is located in Al Rashidiya, a community of eastern Dubai. A residential area, most points of interest near the station are schools and community centres, although Centrepoint is the closest Metro station to the Dubai Airport Expo.
The Dubai Royal Air Wing of the Dubai International Airport is located quite close to the station.

History
As one of the initial stations of the Dubai Metro, Centrepoint opened on 9 September 2009; trains ran to Nakheel Harbour and Tower and served seven intermediate stations. In 2011, Centrepoint handled 2,634,139 passengers, making it one of the busiest stations on the Dubai Metro.

Station layout

Centrepoint is one of the few stations of the Dubai Metro classed as a type 3 elevated station, indicating it has three tracks rather than the usual two. This allows trains to be held and stored easily. The tracks to and from Centrepoint parallel the southern side of Airport Road, continuing eastward to one of the network's depots.

Platform layout

References

Railway stations in the United Arab Emirates opened in 2009
Dubai Metro stations